The 2018 Porsche Mobil 1 Supercup was the 26th Porsche Supercup season. It began on 13 May at Circuit de Catalunya and ended on 28 October at Autódromo Hermanos Rodríguez, after ten scheduled races, all of which were support events for the 2018 Formula One season.

Teams and drivers

Entry list was announced on 3 May 2018:

Race calendar and results

Championship standings

Drivers' Championship

Notes
† – Drivers did not finish the race, but were classified as they completed over 75% of the race distance.

^ – Drivers took part in the races with different competition numbers

References

External links
 
 Porsche Mobil 1 Supercup Online Magazine

Porsche Supercup seasons
Porsche Supercup